Pachnoda savignyi, the sun beetle, is a beetle belonging to the family Scarabaeidae.

Subspecies
 Pachnoda savignyi consentanea Schaum, 1844
 Pachnoda savignyi savignyi (Gory & Percheron, 1833)

Description
These beetles have slightly flat, square robust bodies with a dark brown-and-yellow or orange colour pattern.

Distribution
This species can be found in North Africa (Morocco, Egypt, Senegal, Chad, Mali).

Etymology
The name honours Marie Jules César Savigny.

References

 Gory M.H. & Percheron M.A. (1833) Monographie des Cétoines et genres voisins, formant dans les familles naturelles de Latreille, le division des Scarabées Mélitophiles, J.B.Baillières editor. Paris :1-410
 Scarabs: World Scarabaeidae Database. Schoolmeesters P.,

Cetoniinae
Beetles described in 1833